Mathieu Guy (born January 3, 1983, in Toulouse) is a French professional football player, who currently plays for Toulouse-Fontaines.

Career
He played on the professional level in Ligue 2 for Amiens SC and in the Championnat de France amateur for SR Colmar.

Notes

1983 births
Living people
French footballers
Ligue 2 players
Amiens SC players
SR Colmar players
US Lesquin players
Toulouse Fontaines Club players
AS Illzach Modenheim players
Association football defenders